Mary Hobart (1851–c.1930) was an American physician in Boston, Massachusetts in the late 19th and early 20th century. She specialized in obstetrics where she was known for her independence and resources. Her career had parallels with that of her great-great-grandmother, Martha Ballard; but Mary Hobart sought out the medical profession by her own ambition as an early entrant. Her service was due in part to caring for the poor in hospitals.

Hobart chose to remain single for her entire life, since she could independently support herself. She practiced for 30 years in Boston before she decided to retire in Needham Heights, Massachusetts.

Adolescence 
Hobart was born in Boston in 1851. She trained at the Women's Medical College, of the New York Infirmary for Women and Children until 1884. The hospital was founded by Dr. Elizabeth Blackwell, the first woman to graduate from medical school in the United States. The opening of this school was due in part to many other medical schools closing down their doors to females.

Martha Ballard's Diary 
By the time Hobart graduated from the Women's Medical College, her cousin Lucy Lambard Fessenden gathered her great-great-grandmother's historical diary for her great aunts to give to Mary. Though Mary is known to be a pioneer in medicine, her great-great-grandmother, Martha Ballard, is a late 18th-century housewife whose diary is the main source for the book, A Midwife’s Tale. Since Hobart was one of few to graduate from medical school in her family, it was only fitting to have a diary of medical importance passed down to her. Hobart was thirty-three when she received “a hopeless pile of loose unconsecutive pages”. Her great aunts, Sarah Lambard and Hannah Lambard Walcott, decided it was best for Hobart to take care of the diary. She decided to donate the diary to the Maine State Library in 1930. In exchange of the donation, Hobart expected a transcript copy of the diary. She never received a full translation of the work, but Hobart was grateful for the parts she was given.

Adulthood 
Following the Women's Medical College, she was practicing medicine at the New England Hospital for Women and Children from 1886 until 1913[1] . The hospital was founded in 1862 by Dr. Marie Zakrzewska. Here, Hobart specialized in obstetrics[2],concentrating on pregnancies, childbirth, and postpartum period.

Once Hobart decided to retire, she took up a private life in Needham Heights, Massachusetts. There, she became a member of the Massachusetts Medical Society. Women were allowed to enter the Massachusetts Medical Society on June 10, 1884, the same year Hobart received Martha Ballard's historical diary.

References 

People from Boston
1851 births
Year of death missing
American obstetricians
19th-century American women physicians
19th-century American physicians